Lobelia douglasiana is a flowering plant in the family Campanulaceae and is endemic to northern Australia. It is a small, spreading herb with blue and white flowers.

Description
Flowering occurs from April to August.

Taxonomy and naming
Lobelia douglasiana was first formally described in 1897 by Frederick Manson Bailey and the description was published in the Queensland Agricultural Journal. The specific epithet (douglasiana)  may have been named after the politician John Douglas (1828–1904).

Distribution and habitat
This lobelia grows in moist soils, laterite and clay near watercourses in Queensland, Western Australia and the Northern Territory.

References

douglasiana
Flora of Western Australia
Flora of Queensland
Flora of the Northern Territory
Plants described in 1897